Amsterdamscheveld is a hamlet in the Netherlands and is part of the Emmen municipality in Drenthe.

Overview 
In 1909, the land was bought by the Griendtsveen Turfstrooisel Mij who built a turf straw factory at the site. A hamlet for the workers was constructed along the canal. In 1932, it was home to 1,377 people.

Amsterdamscheveld is a statistical entity, however the postal authorities have placed it under Erica.

The narrow gauge industrial railway museum is located in Amsterdamscheveld, and uses tracks which were previously used by the factory.

References 

Populated places in Drenthe
Emmen, Netherlands